MCF Employees' Union, a trade union at the Mangalore Chemicals and Fertilisers, in Karnataka, India. MCFEU is affiliated to Hind Mazdoor Sabha.

Trade unions in India
Hind Mazdoor Sabha-affiliated unions
Trade unions at the Mangalore Chemicals and Fertilisers
Chemical industry trade unions
Organizations with year of establishment missing